Stomatella lintricula is a species of sea snail, a marine gastropod mollusk in the family Trochidae, the top snails.

Description
The thin, fragile, oblong shell is shaped like a Haliotis. Its back is convex. It is all over very delicately striated. It is flesh-colored, spotted with red. The small spire is nearly terminal and laterally inclined. The open aperture is very much lengthened.

Schepman gives a somewhat divergent description: the posterior part of the shell is nearly entirely yellowish-white with a green tinge, moreover a few smaller patches of the same colour are dispersed over the anterior part, a few dark spiral lines are more conspicuous on the posterior part. The surface is covered with very fine, close-set spiral and by more remote concentric striae. The species may be easily recognized by its very elongate shape.

Distribution
This marine species occurs in the Red Sea, in the Indo-Pacific (Indo-China, Indo-Malaysia, the Philippines, Japan) and off Queensland, Australia.

References

  Proceedings of the Zoological Society of London. pt. 18-19 (1850-1851)
 Adams, A. 1854. Monograph of Stomatellinae. A sub-family of Trochidae. 827-846, pls 173-175 in Sowerby, G.B. (ed). Thesaurus Conchyliorum. London : Sowerby Vol. 2.
 Brazier, J. 1877. Continuation of the Mollusca collected during the Chevert Expedition. Proceedings of the Linnean Society of New South Wales 2: 41-53 
 Habe, T. 1964. Shells of the Western Pacific in color. Osaka : Hoikusha Vol. 2 233 pp., 66 pls.
 Higo, S., Callomon, P. & Goto, Y. (2001) Catalogue and Bibliography of the Marine Shell-Bearing Mollusca of Japan. Gastropoda Bivalvia Polyplacophora Scaphopoda Type Figures. Elle Scientific Publications, Yao, Japan, 208 pp

lintricula
Gastropods described in 1850